A church hall or parish hall is a room or building associated with a church, generally for community and charitable use. In smaller and village communities, it is often a separate building near the church, while on more restricted urban sites it may be in the basement or a wing of the main church building. Activities in the hall are not necessarily religious, but parts of local community life, similarly to in an assembly hall.

See also 

 Chapter house
 Community centre
 Fellowship hall
 Hall church
 Rectory
 Refectory
 Village hall

References 

Rooms
Church architecture
Communities